Dariusz Stachowiak  (born 18 July 1984 in Września) is a Polish footballer (midfielder) who plays for Polish Orange Ekstraklasa side ŁKS Łódź.

External links

1984 births
Living people
Polish footballers
Lech Poznań players
Górnik Zabrze players
ŁKS Łódź players
People from Września County
Sportspeople from Greater Poland Voivodeship
Association football midfielders